John Anthony Alexander Rous, 4th Earl of Stradbroke, KStJ (1 April 1903 – 14 July 1983), was a British nobleman, the son of George Rous, 3rd Earl of Stradbroke. He was styled Viscount Dunwich from birth until acceding to the earldom in 1947.

He was educated at the Royal Naval College, Osborne, and the Royal Naval College, Dartmouth then served from 1917 to 1928 and again, through World War II, between 1939 and 1945. He was Secretary to the Governor of Victoria from 1946 to 1947. He was a member of East Suffolk County Council from 1931 to 1945; and an Alderman from 1953 to 1964. In 1978 he was awarded the Scout Association's prestigious Silver Wolf Award.

He was succeeded by his brother William Rous, 5th Earl of Stradbroke.

References

1903 births
1983 deaths
Members of East Suffolk County Council
Earls in the Peerage of the United Kingdom
Lord-Lieutenants of Suffolk
People from Blythburgh
Graduates of Britannia Royal Naval College
People educated at the Royal Naval College, Osborne